Anthoboscus is a genus of beetles in the family Cerambycidae, containing the following species:

 Anthoboscus oculatus Giesbert, 1992
 Anthoboscus tricolor (Chevrolat, 1835)

References

Clytini